Pouya or Pooya or Puya is a masculine first name of Iranian origin (from a Persian word meaning "dynamic" , "in move" or "searcher"). Notable people with the name include:

First name
 Pouya Jalili Pour, Iranian-born singer, born 1976
 Pouya Bakhtiari, Iranian protester, born 1992
 Pouya Idani, Iranian chess-player, born 1995
 Pouya Norouzinejad, Iranian handball-player, born 1994
 Pouya Saraei, Iranian composer, born 1983
 Pouya Khazaeli, Iranian architect
 Pouya Seifpanahi, Iranian footballer, born 1986
 Pouya Tajik, Iranian footballer, born 1980
 Poya Asbaghi, Swedish-Iranian football manager, born 1985

Last name
 Ashkan Pouya, Swedish Serial Entrepreneur, born 1976
 Kevin Pouya, known mononymously as Pouya, American rapper, born 1994
 Mahdi Puya, Iranian Islamic scholar in Indian Sub-continent, (1899—1973)

Persian-language surnames